Noel O Loban (born 29 April 1957) is a former British freestyle wrestler.

Wrestling career
Noel won the 1980 NCAA National Championship in the 190lb weight division for Clemson University, beating Dan Severn of Arizona State. It was the first sports national championship in Clemson school history. 
Loban competed in the 1984 Summer Olympics, where he won a bronze medal in the light-heavyweight category and also competed in the 1988 Summer Olympics . He represented England and won a gold medal in the 90 kg light-heavyweight, at the 1986 Commonwealth Games in Edinburgh, Scotland. Eight years later he won a bronze medal in the 100 kg heavyweight division, at the 1994 Commonwealth Games.

Coaching career

Since 2008, Loban has been the Director of Student-Athlete Development for the N.C. State University wrestling program.

References

External links
 

1957 births
Living people
Olympic wrestlers of Great Britain
Wrestlers at the 1984 Summer Olympics
Wrestlers at the 1988 Summer Olympics
British male sport wrestlers
Olympic bronze medallists for Great Britain
Olympic medalists in wrestling
Commonwealth Games gold medallists for England
Commonwealth Games silver medallists for England
Wrestlers at the 1986 Commonwealth Games
Wrestlers at the 1994 Commonwealth Games
Medalists at the 1984 Summer Olympics
Clemson Tigers wrestlers
Commonwealth Games medallists in wrestling
Medallists at the 1986 Commonwealth Games
Medallists at the 1994 Commonwealth Games